Norape is a genus of moths in the family Megalopygidae. The genus was erected by Francis Walker in 1855.

Species
Norape acuta Hopp, 1927
Norape albilineata (Hopp, 1927)
Norape argyrorrhoea Hübner, 1825
Norape arietina Hopp, 1927
Norape beggoides (Dyar, 1910)
Norape cana (Dognin, 1907)
Norape capreolata Hopp, 1927
Norape caprina Hopp, 1927
Norape catharus Dyar, 1910
Norape cingulata E. D. Jones, 1921
Norape consolida Hopp, 1927
Norape cornuta Hopp, 1927
Norape cretacea (Hopp, 1922)
Norape damana Hopp, 1930
Norape discrepans (Wallengren, 1860)
Norape draudti Hopp, 1927
Norape dyarensis Hopp, 1929
Norape foliata Hopp, 1927
Norape fuscoapicata Dognin, 1924
Norape glabra Hopp, 1927
Norape hadaca Dyar, 1910
Norape incolorata (E. D. Jones, 1921)
Norape insinuata Hopp, 1927
Norape isabela Hopp, 1935
Norape jaramillo (Dognin, 1890)
Norape jordani Hopp, 1927
Norape flavescens Dognin, 1914
Norape laticosta (Dyar, 1899)
Norape mexicana (Schaus, 1892)
Norape miasma Dyar, 1910
Norape miasmoides Hopp, 1927
Norape muelleri Hopp, 1927
Norape nevermanni Hopp, 1927
Norape nigrovenosa (Druce, 1906)
Norape obtusa Hopp, 1927
Norape ovina (Sepp, 1852)
Norape pampana Hopp, 1927
Norape plumosa (Butler, 1877)
Norape plumosa angustior Hopp, 1927
Norape plumosa biacuta Hopp, 1927
Norape puella Walker, 1855
Norape rothschildi Hopp, 1927
Norape schausi Hopp, 1927
Norape tamsi Hopp, 1927
Norape taurina Hopp, 1927
Norape tener (Druce, 1897)
Norape testudinalis Hopp, 1929
Norape tosca Hopp, 1927
Norape truncata Hopp, 1927
Norape truncata cavata Hopp, 1927
Norape truncata hastata Hopp, 1927
Norape undulata E. D. Jones, 1912
Norape variabilis Hopp, 1927
Norape venata Schaus, 1900
Norape vesta (Schaus, 1892)
Norape virgo (Butler, 1877)
Norape walkeri (Butler, 1877)
Norape xantholopha Dyar, 1914
Norape xantholopha major Hopp, 1927
Norape xantholopha minor Hopp, 1927
Norape zikaniana Hopp, 1927

References

Megalopygidae
Megalopygidae genera